Hurst Hill is a location on Anglezarke Moor, within the West Pennine Moors of Lancashire, England.  Despite a modest height of 317 metres (1040 feet), the summit provides excellent views towards the Irish Sea.  Of more note, however, is its location between Round Loaf and Pikestones, both of which are Neolithic remnants.  It is probable that Hurst Hill (and nearby Grain Pole Hill) were vantage points for the ancient communities.  No excavation work has taken place.

External links
 Photographs from the summit

Geography of Chorley
Mountains and hills of Lancashire
Hills of the West Pennine Moors